
Gmina Klwów is a rural gmina (administrative district) in Przysucha County, Masovian Voivodeship, in east-central Poland.

Villages
Gmina Klwów contains the villages and settlements of Borowa Wola, Brzeski, Drążno, Głuszyna, Kadź, Kłudno, Klwów, Ligęzów, Nowy Świat, Podczasza Wola, Przystałowice Duże, Przystałowice Duże-Kolonia, Sady-Kolonia, Sulgostów, Ulów and Ulów-Kolonia.

Neighbouring gminas
Gmina Klwów is bordered by the gminas of Nowe Miasto nad Pilicą, Odrzywół, Potworów, Rusinów and Wyśmierzyce.

References
 Polish official population figures 2006

Klwow
Przysucha County